Pasha Kola (also Romanized as Pāshā Kolā) is a village in Kalej Rural District, in the Central District of Nowshahr County, Mazandaran Province, Iran. At the 2006 census, its population was 719, in 192 families.

References 

Populated places in Nowshahr County